Ali Abuzamia (born 25 December 1968) is a Jordanian fencer. He competed in the individual épée event at the 1988 Summer Olympics, losing all four of his bouts.

References

External links
 

1968 births
Living people
Jordanian male épée fencers
Olympic fencers of Jordan
Fencers at the 1988 Summer Olympics